Patrick Hausding (born 9 March 1989) is a German diver.

At the 2020 Summer Olympics in Tokyo, with his teammate Lars Rüdiger, Hausding won a bronze medal in the men's synchronized 3 metre springboard competition. However, he did not repeat his bronze medal success in the men's 3 m springboard competition from the 2016 Summer Olympics in Rio de Janeiro, failing to proceed beyond the preliminary round in Tokyo, finishing 21st in a field of 29 divers.  

At the 2016 Summer Olympics, in addition to his bronze medal success in the men's 3 m springboard competition, Hausding competed in the men's synchronized 3 m springboard event with teammate Stephan Feck. They finished in 4th place.  He also competed in the men's synchronized 10 m platform event with teammate Sascha Klein. They finished in 4th place.

At the 2012 Summer Olympics, he competed in the 3 m springboard and the men's 10 m synchronised platform with Sascha Klein.

Competing in the 2008 Summer Olympics, he won a silver medal in the men's synchronized 10 metre platform with teammate Sascha Klein.

References

External links

Bio at 2008 Olympics site

1989 births
Living people
German male divers
Olympic divers of Germany
Olympic silver medalists for Germany
Olympic bronze medalists for Germany
Divers at the 2008 Summer Olympics
Divers at the 2012 Summer Olympics
Divers at the 2016 Summer Olympics
Divers at the 2020 Summer Olympics
Divers from Berlin
Olympic medalists in diving
Medalists at the 2008 Summer Olympics
Medalists at the 2016 Summer Olympics
Medalists at the 2020 Summer Olympics
World Aquatics Championships medalists in diving
People from Lichtenberg
21st-century German people